Major-General William John Butterworth    (10 June 1801 – 4 November 1856) was the governor of the Straits Settlements from August 1843 to 21 March 1855.  In 1851, when the Straits Settlements were transferred from the authority of the Governor of Bengal to be directly under the control of the Governor-General of India, Butterworth remained as governor.

Career
Butterworth joined the army in Madras and rose to the rank of lieutenant-colonel in the 38th Madras Regiment. While he was governor of the Straits Settlements, Butterworth was instrumental in establishing the Singapore Volunteer Corps.
Butterworth was later promoted to Major General in 1855.

Personal life
Butterworth's parents were Captain William Butterworth RN and his wife Ann (née Hodgkinson). Captain Butterworth died at the Battle of Trafalgar in 1805.

Awards and honours
Butterworth was appointed a Companion of the Order of the Bath (CB) in the 1838 Coronation Honours.

Legacy
The town of Butterworth, Penang is named after him.

References

Governors of the Straits Settlements
1801 births
1856 deaths
Companions of the Order of the Bath
Administrators in British Singapore